"Over and Over Again" is a power ballad by the Dutch singer-songwriter Robby Valentine from his self-titled album released in 1992. It was his biggest hit single, peaked at #6 on Dutch Singles Chart.

Charts

References

External links
Robby Valentine's "Over and Over Again" on Last.fm

1990s ballads
1991 singles
1991 songs
Pop ballads
Rock ballads
Soft rock songs